Provoked is the third studio album by American country music singer Sunny Sweeney. It was released on August 5, 2014, via Thirty Tigers/Aunt Daddy Records. The album includes the singles "Bad Girl Phase" and "My Bed," which were Number One hits on the Texas Music Charts.

Content
After parting ways with Republic Nashville in 2012, Sweeney signed a recording contract with the Thirty Tigers record label, and released Provoked, her first album under the imprint, on August 5, 2014. The set was produced by Luke Wooten and Sweeney co-wrote 11 of the album's 13 songs, many of which were inspired by her personal life, which included a divorce from her first husband.

"Bad Girl Phase" was released in June 2014 as the lead-off single. Although the single failed to reach the Billboard charts, it was a Number One hit on the Texas Music Chart for the chart week of October 20, 2014. In doing so, Sweeney became the first female to top the chart in over ten years.

"Can't Let Go" was previously recorded by Lucinda Williams and Heidi Newfield, and the album also includes a duet with Will Hoge on "My Bed," which was released as the album's second single in early 2015. "My Bed" became a Number One hit on the Texas Music Chart in June 2015, making Sweeney the first female in the history of the chart to score back-to-back Number One hits.

Reception

Commercial
The album debuted at number 165 on the U.S. Billboard 200 and number 20 on the Billboard Top Country Albums chart upon its release. It had sold 2,900 copies after two weeks.

Critical
Thom Jurek of allmusic gave the album four stars out of five, praising the record as Sweeney's most consistent and diverse: "It's a provocative album, detailing a difficult journey through disappointment, doubt, darkness, and ultimately triumph. It's chock-full of vulnerability, accountability, an acidic wit and strength." Writing for Cuepoint, the Dean of American rock critics Robert Christgau gave the record an A−. His write-up claimed that Sweeney gave "bros the finger" and that "the former Republic Nashville wannabe" turned "her whole album into what Clark or Jessie Jo Dillon or maybe it was Shannon Wright thought to call 'a bad girl phase.'" Christgau went on to call Sweeney "marketable" and praised her co-writers.

Track listing

Personnel

 Isabelle Adams – children's choir
 Molly Bacurin – children's choir
 Jake Clayton – banjo, dobro, cello, fiddle
 Elizabeth Cook – children's choir
 J.T. Corenflos – electric guitar
 Gibb Droll – electric guitar
 Fred Eltringham – drums, percussion
 Michael Hellmer – children's choir
 Will Hoge – duet vocals on "My Bed"
 Joanna Janét – background vocals
 Mike Johnson – lap steel guitar, pedal steel guitar
 Gayle Mayes – background vocals
 Gwen Merrill – children's choir
 Alison Prestwood – bass guitar
 Angela Primm – background vocals
 Mike Rojas – accordion, keyboards, organ
 Steve Sheehan – acoustic guitar
 Hannah Smith – children's choir
 Bryan Sutton – acoustic guitar
 Sunny Sweeney – lead vocals
 Russell Terrell – background vocals
 Emma Wooten – children's choir
 Luke Wooten – electric guitar, kazoo, background vocals

Chart performance

References

2014 albums
Sunny Sweeney albums